Una Raymond-Hoey (born 28 October 1996) is an Irish cricketer who has played for Scorchers, Typhoons, Melbourne Stars, Victoria and Ireland.

Raymond-Hoey has played in four One Day Internationals matches, making her debut against South Africa during their August 2016 tour. An opening batter, she scored 25 on her debut at the Malahide Cricket Club Ground.

In November 2018, she was named the International Emerging Player of the Year at the annual Cricket Ireland Awards.

In May 2019, she was named in Ireland's Women's Twenty20 International (WT20I) squad for their series against the West Indies. She made her WT20I debut for Ireland against the West Indies on 26 May 2019.

In August 2019, she was named in Ireland's squad for the 2019 ICC Women's World Twenty20 Qualifier tournament in Scotland. In July 2020, she was awarded a non-retainer contract by Cricket Ireland for the following year.

In October 2022, Raymond-Hoey was signed by Melbourne Stars for the 2022–23 Women's Big Bash League season as a replacement for Meg Lanning. She qualified as a local player, having emigrated to Australia to work and play cricket. Later in the same season, she joined Victoria.

References

External links

1996 births
Living people
Cricketers from Dublin (city)
Ireland women One Day International cricketers
Ireland women Twenty20 International cricketers
Irish women cricketers
Scorchers (women's cricket) cricketers
Typhoons (women's cricket) cricketers
Victoria women cricketers
Melbourne Stars (WBBL) cricketers